The Economy of Assam is largely agriculture based with 69% of the population engaged in it.

Macro-economic trend
Economy of Assam today represents a unique juxtaposition of backwardness amidst plenty. Growth rate of Assam's income has not kept pace with that of India's during the Post-British Era; differences increased rapidly since the 1970s. While the Indian economy grew at 6 percent per annum over the period of 1981 to 2000, the same of Assam's grew only by 3.3 percent. In the Sixth Plan period Assam experienced a negative growth rate of 3.78 percent against a growth rate of 6 percent of India's. In the post-liberalised era (after 1991), the gaps between growth rates of Assam's and India's economy widened further.

In the current decade, according to recent analysis, Assam's economy is showing signs of improvement. In the year 2001–2002, the economy grew in 1993-94 constant prices at 4.5 percent, falling to 3.4 percent in the next financial year. During 2003-2004 and 2004–2005, in the same constant prices, the economy grew more satisfactorily at 5.5 and 5.3 percent respectively. The advanced estimates placed the growth rate for the year 2005–2006 at above 6 percent.

In the 1950s, soon after the independence, per capita income in Assam was little higher than that in India; it is much lower today. In the year 2000–2001, per capita income in Assam was INR 6,157 at constant prices (1993–94) and INR 10,198 at current prices, which is almost 40 percent lower than that in India. According to the recent estimates, per capita income in Assam at 1993-94 constant prices has reached INR 6520 in 2003-2004 and INR 6756 in 2004–2005, which is still much lower than the same of India.

This is a chart of trend of gross state domestic product of Assam at market prices estimated by Ministry of Statistics and Programme Implementation with figures in millions of Indian Rupees.

Assam's gross state domestic product for 2004 is estimated at $13 billion in current prices.

Sectoral analysis again exhibits a dismal picture. The average annual growth rate of agriculture, which was only 2.6 percent per annum over 1980s fell to 1.6 percent in the 1990s. The manufacturing sector showed some improvement in the 1990s with a growth rate of 3.4 percent per annum than 2.4 percent in the 1980s. In the past five decades, the tertiary sector has registered the highest growth rates than the primary and secondary sectors, which have slowed more in the 1990s than in the 1980s.

Agriculture and Livestock

Agriculture accounts for more than a third of Assam's income and employs 69 percent of total workforce. Assam's biggest contribution to the world is its tea. Assam produces some of the finest and most expensive teas in the world. Other than the Chinese tea variety Camellia sinensis, Assam is the only region in the world that has its own variety of tea, called Camellia assamica. Assam tea is grown at elevations near sea level, giving it a malty sweetness and an earthy flavor, as opposed to the more floral aroma of highland (e.g. Darjeeling, Taiwanese) teas. Assam also accounts for fair share of India's production of rice, rapeseed, mustard, jute, potato, sweet potato, banana, papaya, areca nut and turmeric. Assam is also a home of large varieties of citrus fruits, leaf vegetables, vegetables, useful grasses, herbs, spices, etc. which are mostly subsistence crops.

Given below is a table of 2015 national output share of select agricultural crops and allied segments in Assam based on 2011 prices

Assam's agriculture has yet to experience modernisation in a real sense and is lagging behind. With implications to food security, per capita food grain production has declined in past five decades. On the other hand, although productivity of crops increased marginally, still these are much lower in comparison to highly productive regions. For instance, yield of rice, which is staple food of Assam, was just 1531 kg per hectare against India's 1927 kg per hectare in 2000-2001 (which itself is much lower than Egypt’s 9283, United States's 7279, South Korea’s 6838, Japan's 6635 and China's 6131 kg per hectare in 2001). On the other hand, although having a strong domestic demand, 1.5 million hectares of inland water bodies and numerous rivers and streams and 165 varieties of fishes, fishing is still in its traditional form and production is not self-sufficient.

Oil and Gas

Assam is a major producer of crude oil and natural gas in India. It was placed as the second in the world, (after Titusville in the United States) where petroleum was discovered. Asia's first successful mechanically drilled oil well was drilled in Makum (Assam) way back in 1867. The second oldest oil well in the world still produces crudes oil. Most of the oilfields of Assam are located in the Upper Assam region of the Brahmaputra Valley. Assam has four oil refineries located at Guwahati, Digboi, Numaligarh and Bongaigaon with a total capacity of 7 million tonnes per year. Bongaigaon Refinery and Petrochemicals Limited (BRPL) is the only S&P CNX 500 conglomerate with a corporate office in Assam.
One of the biggest public sector oil company of the country, Oil India Ltd. has its plant and headquarter at Duliajan.

Other Industries
Apart from tea and petroleum refineries, Assam has few industries of significance. Industrial development is inhibited by its physical and political isolation from neighbouring countries such as Myanmar, China and Thailand and from the other growing South East Asian economies. The region is landlocked and situated in the easternmost periphery of India and is linked to the central India by a flood and cyclone prone narrow corridor with weak transportation infrastructure. The international airport in Guwahati is yet to find airlines providing better direct international flights. The Brahmaputra suitable for navigation does not have sufficient infrastructure for international trade and success of such a navigable trade route will be dependent on proper channel maintenance, and diplomatic and trade relationships with Bangladesh.

Although having a poor overall industrial performance, there are several other industries, including a chemical fertiliser plant at Namrup, petrochemical industries at Namrup and Bongaigaon, paper mills at Jagiroad, Panchgram and Jogighopa, sugar mills at Barua Bamun Gaon, Chargola, Kampur, cement plant at Bokajan, cosmetics plant of Hindustan Unilever(HUL) at Doom Dooma, etc. Moreover, there are other industries such as jute mill, textile and yarn mills, silk mill, etc. Many of these industries are facing loss and closer due to lack of infrastructure and improper management practices.

Notes

Paper mills at Jogighopa, Jagiroad and Panchagram are no longer functioning.

References

 Assam Human Development Report 2003